Tân Ninh may refer to several places in Vietnam, including:

 , a rural commune of Tân Thạnh District.
 Tân Ninh, Quảng Bình, a rural commune of Quảng Ninh District.